"Baby Goodbye" is the fourth single released by Swedish boy band E.M.D., who entered Melodifestivalen 2009 with the song and won a place in the finals. It became the group's fourth consecutive #1 single, debuting at #3 on the official Swedish Singles Chart, and reaching the top spot the week after, spending 3 weeks at number one.

Track listing
 "Baby Goodbye (Album Version)" - 2:56
 "Baby Goodbye (Extended Version)" - 3:47
 "Baby Goodbye (Instrumental)" - 2:56

Charts

References

2009 singles
E.M.D. songs
Melodifestivalen songs of 2009
Number-one singles in Sweden
Songs written by Oscar Görres
2009 songs
Songs written by Danny Saucedo
Sony BMG singles
Songs written by Mattias Andréasson